Nepenthes samar is a tropical pitcher plant native to the Philippines. It is known only from the island of Samar, after which it is named. It is closely allied to N. merrilliana.

References

 Mey, F.S. 2013. Nepenthes samar and N. viridis: two new taxa and the emergence of two Nepenthes taxonomy schools? Strange Fruits: A Garden's Chronicle, October 23, 2013.
 Smith, L. 2014. Pitcher perfect - but carnivorous plants are at risk. The Independent, January 5, 2014. 

Carnivorous plants of Asia
samar
Plants described in 2013
Taxa named by Martin Cheek
Taxa named by Matthew Jebb